This is a list of notable residents of Barnes, London, a district in the London Borough of Richmond upon Thames.

Barnes, in a bend of the River Thames, is in the extreme north-east of Richmond upon Thames (and as such is the closest part of the borough to central London).  Its built environment includes a high proportion of 18th- and 19th-century buildings in the streets near Barnes Pond. Together these make up the Barnes Village conservation area, where along with its west riverside most of the mid-19th century properties are concentrated. 

Barnes has retained its village-like atmosphere and, with its easy links to central London, it has attracted residents from the financial and arts sectors.Its past residents include the composer Gustav Holst (1874–1934) and Ninette de Valois (1898–2001), founder of the Royal Ballet. They each lived in houses on The Terrace which are marked by blue plaques.

Living people

Historical figures
Those marked § are commemorated in Barnes by a blue plaque.

Actors

Artists, architects and designers

Military

Musicians

Sportspeople

Writers

See also
 Barnes, London
 List of people from the London Borough of Richmond upon Thames

Notes

References

Barnes, London
History of the London Borough of Richmond upon Thames
People from the London Borough of Richmond upon Thames
Lists of people from London